Gennari is an Italian surname. Notable people with the surname include:

Alessia Gennari (born (1991), Italian female volleyball player
Bartolomeo Gennari (1594-1661), Italian Renaissance painter
Benedetto Gennari (1563–1658), Italian painter of the early-Baroque period
Benedetto Gennari II (1633–1715), Italian painter active during the Baroque period
Casimiro Gennari (1839–1914), Italian cardinal of the Roman Catholic Church
Cesare Gennari (1637–1688), Italian painter of the Baroque period
Egidio Gennari (1876–1942), Italian politician
Enrico Gennari (born 1977), Italian marine biologist
Ercole Gennari (1597-1658), Italian Renaissance drawer and painter
Francesco Gennari (1750–1797), Italian anatomist
Lina Gennari (1911–1997), Italian actress and operetta singer
Lorenzo Gennari (1595–1665/1672), Italian Renaissance painter
Marco Antonio Gennari (born 1992), Italian rugby union player
Mattia Gennari (born 1991), Italian footballer
Mirco Gennari (born 1966), Sammarinese former footballer
Paolo Gennari (1908–1968), Italian rower
Patrizio Gennari (1820–1897), Italian botanist
Tony Gennari (born 1942), Italian-American former professional basketball player

See also
Line of Gennari, also called the "band" or "stria" of Gennari
Still-Gennari reaction

Italian-language surnames